So Big is a 1924 American silent drama film based on Edna Ferber's 1924 novel of the same name which won the Pulitzer Prize for the Novel in 1925. It was produced by independent producer Earl Hudson the film and distributed through Associated First National. Unseen for decades, it is considered to be a lost film. Only a trailer survives at the Library of Congress.

Plot
As described in a review in a film magazine, after returning from a tour of Europe with her father and finishing a course at a fashionable finishing school in the year 1888, Selina Peake (Moore) is shocked to find that her father is a gambler and has been killed during an accident in a gambling den. Left penniless, she gets a job as a school teacher in the Dutch colony at High Prairie. She marries Pervus DeJong (Bowers), a dull-witted and poor farmer, and soon finds that her life is one of drudgery, lightened only by her love of her son Dirk, whom she calls "So Big." When Pervus dies, Selina in old clothes, reduced to poverty, peddles vegetables. The father of a former school friend advances her a little money and, by stinting and hard work, after 18 years she has made the farm pay. Dirk (Lyon) has been educated as an architect and wins a competition. Dirk is loved by Dallas (Haver), an artist, but owes much of his success to Mrs. Paula Storm (Theby), a discontented wife who persuades him to elope with her. Selina learns of this, and begs the pair to give up the wild idea. Husband William Storm (Herbert) threatens to name Dirk as a correspondent in a divorce suit. After Selina pleads with him, he agrees to drop the matter. Thoroughly repentant, Dirk goes with Selina to see Dallas.

Cast

Reception
Colleen Moore's role in So Big quite different from her usual jazz baby / flapper parts. Because Moore's part in the film was so different from the roles she had become known for following Flaming Youth, there was an outcry against her. Forgotten was that, before her success in Flaming Youth, the vast majority of her roles had been dramatic in character, a few even tragic. She had not only played mothers, but mothers who had lost children (Broken Chains) and mothers who died (Dinty). Still, her performance generally was well received. The film, however, was not as big a success as her previous few comedies, and so Sally was lined up to follow So Big. Moore wrote in Silent Star that, upon meeting Edna Ferber some years after the film, the author gave her approval of Moore's performance.

See also
List of lost films

References

External links

Posters for the 1924 version of So Big  poster #1, poster #2 (new link)
Stills at silentfilmstillarchive.com

1924 films
Films set in 1888
American silent feature films
Films based on American novels
Films directed by Charles Brabin
Lost American films
First National Pictures films
American black-and-white films
Films based on works by Edna Ferber
Silent American drama films
1924 drama films
1924 lost films
Lost drama films
1920s American films